Jianshi County is a county of southwestern Hubei province, People's Republic of China. It is under the administration of the  Enshi Tujia and Miao Autonomous Prefecture.

Administrative Divisions

Seven towns:
Yezhou, Gaoping, Hongyansi, Jingyang, Guandian, Huaping (before 2011, Huaping Township ), Changliang (formerly Changliang Township )

Three townships:
Maotian Township, Longping Township, Sanli Township

Climate

References

Counties of Hubei
Enshi Tujia and Miao Autonomous Prefecture